Nicholas Darnell (18 November 1817 – 8 April 1892) was an English first-class cricketer, barrister and Catholic priest.

The son of William Nicholas Darnell, he was born at Stockton-on-Tees in November 1817. He was educated at Winchester College, before going up to Exeter College, Oxford in 1836. While studying at Oxford, he made his debut in first-class cricket for the Gentlemen in the Gentlemen v Players fixture of 1836. The following year, he made his debut for Oxford University against the Marylebone Cricket Club and played first-class matches for Oxford until 1840, making a total of eight appearances. Playing as a bowler, Darnell took 28 wickets in his nine first-class matches, taking a five wicket haul once for Oxford University in 1840.

He was elected a fellow of New College, Oxford in 1837, holding the post until 1847. A member of Lincoln's Inn from 1844, Darnell was a practicing barrister. He converted to Catholicism in 1847 and later undertook ecclesiastical duties as a Catholic priest. Darnell died in April 1892 at Clifton, Bristol.

References

External links

1817 births
1892 deaths
Cricketers from Stockton-on-Tees
People educated at Winchester College
Alumni of Exeter College, Oxford
English cricketers
Gentlemen cricketers
Oxford University cricketers
Fellows of New College, Oxford
Members of Lincoln's Inn
English barristers
Converts to Roman Catholicism from Anglicanism
19th-century English Roman Catholic priests
19th-century English lawyers